Oliva dubia is a species of sea snail, a marine gastropod mollusk in the family Olividae, the olives.

Description

Distribution

References

External links

dubia
Gastropods described in 1904